Thirumalaisamudram is a village in Thanjavur taluk of Thanjavur district, Tamil Nadu. It is located at a distance of 17 kilometres west of Thanjavur, 5 kilometres from Vallam and 39 kilometres east of Tiruchirapalli on the Thanjavur-Tiruchirapalli highway of National Highway 83 (India). It adjoins the neighbouring village of Vallam Pudursethi.

Importance 

Thirumalaisamudram has risen in importance due to the emergence of SASTRA University. The university covers most of the north-eastern part of the village. There are also a number of tea shops and restaurants adjoining the college.

Geography and climate
Thirumalaisamudram is located at  The tributaries of river Cauvery, namely, the Grand Anaicut canal (Pudhaaru), Vadavaaru and Vennaaru rivers flow through the city. To the south of Thanjavur city, is the Vallam tableland, a small plateau interspersed at regular intervals by ridges of sandstone.

The period from November to February in Thirumalaisamudram is pleasant, with a climate full of warm days and cool nights. The onset of summer is from March, with the mercury reaching its peak by the end of May and June. Summer rains are sparse and the first monsoon, the South-West monsoon, commences in June and continues till September. North-East monsoon begins October and continues till January. The rainfall during the South-West monsoon period is much lower than that of the North-East monsoon. The North-East monsoon is beneficial to the district at large because of the heavy rainfall and the Western ghats (mountain ranges) feeding the river Cauvery.

Demographics 

As per the 2011 census, Thirumalaisamudram had a population of 6,783 with 4020 males and 2763 females. The sex ratio was 687 and the literacy rate, 94.88 with Males 97.41 and Females 91.21.

References

 https://censusindia.gov.in/2011census/dchb/DCHB_A/33/3319_PART_A_DCHB_THANJAVUR.pdf

Villages in Thanjavur district